Bronchography is a radiological technique, which involves x-raying the respiratory tree after coating the airways with contrast. Bronchography is rarely performed, as it has been made obsolete with improvements in computed tomography and bronchoscopy.

References

Respiratory system imaging
Projectional radiography